The Southwick-Harmon House is a historic home in Sarasota, Florida. It is located at 1830 Lincoln Drive. On October 28, 2001, it was added to the U.S. National Register of Historic Places.

References and external links

 Sarasota County listings at National Register of Historic Places
 Southwick-Harmon House at Portal of Historic Resources, State of Florida

Houses in Sarasota, Florida
Houses on the National Register of Historic Places in Sarasota County, Florida
Houses completed in 1926
Mediterranean Revival architecture in Florida